Stade Municipal is a multi-use stadium in Bingerville, Côte d'Ivoire.  It is currently used mostly for football matches. It serves as a home ground of Entente Sportive de Bingerville. The stadium holds 4,000 people.

Football venues in Ivory Coast
Buildings and structures in Abidjan
Sport in Abidjan